Matijevići is a village in the Kula Norinska municipality, near Metković. It is situated between the village of Kula Norinska and Momići.

Demographics

References 

Populated places in Dubrovnik-Neretva County